Tris(trimethylsilyl)phosphine is the organophosphorus compound with the formula P(SiMe3)3 (Me = methyl).  It is a colorless liquid that ignites in air and hydrolyses readily.

Synthesis
Tris(trimethylsilyl)phosphine is prepared by treating trimethylsilyl chloride, white phosphorus, and sodium-potassium alloy:
1/4 P4  +  3 Me3SiCl  +  3 K   →  P(SiMe3)3  +  3 KCl
Several other methods exist.

Reactions
The compound hydrolyzes to give phosphine:
P(SiMe3)3  +  3 H2O   →   PH3  +  3 HOSiMe3

Treatment of certain acyl chlorides with tris(trimethylsilyl)phosphine gives phosphaalkynes, one example being tert-butylphosphaacetylene.

Reaction with potassium tert-butoxide cleaves one P-Si bond, giving the phosphide salt:
P(SiMe3)3  +  KO-t-Bu   →   KP(SiMe3)2  +  Me3SiO-t-Bu

It is a reagent in the preparation of metal phosphido clusters by reaction with metal halides or carboxylates.  In such reactions the silyl halide or silyl carboxylate is liberated as illustrated in this idealized reaction:
P(SiMe3)3  +  3 CuCl   →   Cu3P  +  3 ClSiMe3

Safety
Tris(trimethylsilyl)phosphine spontaneously ignites in air, thus it is handled using air-free techniques.

References

Trimethylsilyl compounds
Phosphines